Gold Statue is a 2019 Nigerian comedy adventure drama film produced, written and directed by veteran filmmaker Tade Ogidan. The film stars Gabriel Afolayan and Kunle Remi in the main lead roles. The film was released on 17 May 2019 and received extremely positive reviews from critics. It was also nominated for the Africa Movie Academy Award for Best Nigerian Film for the year 2019. The film also received few awards at film festivals.

Synopsis 
Two young men, Wale (Gabriel Afolayan) and Chike (Kunle Remi) in search of a treasure of "Gold Statue" which is believed to have been a deity inherited by their generation. They witness and go through a series of unimaginable unprecedented unexpected ordeal when attempting to locate where the supposed Gold Statue is located. Eventually, they get the statue and become rich.

Cast 
 Gabriel Afolayan as Wale
 Kunle Remi as Chike
 Richard Mofe Damijo
 Sola Sobowale as Grace
 Kelvin Ikeduba
 Kunle Fawole
 Norbert Young
 Alibaba Akpobome
 Segun Arinze
 Rykardo Agbor

Production 
The veteran filmmaker Tade Ogidan who is also noticeabley the CEO of OGD Pictures made a comeback into the film industry after a gap of eight years through this project. The director himself revealed that the Gold Statue was reborn after 28 years as he insisted that the script for the film was written by him already in 1991 itself. However he couldn't bankroll this project immediately at that time due to financial difficulties. The film project also marked the first onscreen appearance for veteran actors Richard Mofe Damijo and Sola Sobowale together as couples after 21 years.

Awards and nominations

References

External links 
 

2019 films
2010s adventure comedy-drama films
Nigerian comedy films
Nigerian adventure films
English-language Nigerian films
Nigerian drama films
2010s English-language films